Edward John Larson (born September 21, 1953, in Mansfield, Ohio) is an American historian and legal scholar.  He is university professor of history and holds the Hugh & Hazel Darling Chair in Law at Pepperdine University.  He was formerly Herman E. Talmadge Chair of Law and Richard B. Russell Professor of American History at the University of Georgia. He continues to serve as a senior fellow of the University of Georgia's Institute of Higher Education, and is currently a professor at Pepperdine School of Law, where he teaches several classes including Property for the 1Ls.

Background and education
Larson was born in Mansfield, Ohio, and attended Mansfield public schools. He graduated from Williams College and received his J.D. from Harvard University and his Ph.D. in the history of science from the University of Wisconsin–Madison.

Career
Larson has lectured on topics in the history of science, religion, and law at universities across the United States and in Canada, China, Britain, Australia, and South America.  The author of books and articles dealing with voyages of scientific exploration, he has also given lectures at natural history museums and on cruise boats.  His articles have appeared in Nature, Scientific American, The Nation, American History, Time, and various academic history and law journals.

Larson received the 1998 Pulitzer Prize for History for his book Summer for the Gods: The Scopes Trial and America's Continuing Debate Over Science and Religion. The book argues that Inherit the Wind (both the play and the movie) misrepresented the actual Scopes Trial. Unlike in that play and movie, in which reason and tolerance triumph over religiously motivated, unsophisticated anti-evolutionists, Larson's book portrays the trial as an opening salvo in an enduring twentieth-century cultural war involving powerful national forces in science, religion, law and politics. "Indeed," he concludes in the book, "the issues raised by the Scopes trial and legend endure precisely because they embody the characteristically American struggle between individual liberty and majoritarian democracy, and cast it in the timeless debate over science and religion."

In 2004 Larson received an honorary Doctorate in Humane Letters from The Ohio State University. He held the Fulbright Program's John Adams Chair in American Studies in 2000-01 and participated in the National Science Foundation's 2003 Antarctic Artists and Writers Program.  He was a founding fellow of the International Society for Science and Religion.

In 2005 Larson was interviewed by Jon Stewart on The Daily Show on evolution alongside William Dembski and Ellie Crystal. Frequently interviewed on American television and radio, Larson has also appeared multiple times on C-SPAN, including as a featured guest on Booknotes; PBS, including as a historian on Nova and American Experience; NPR, including as a featured guest on Fresh Air with Terry Gross, The Diane Rehm Show, and Talk of the Nation - Science Friday; and History (U.S. TV channel). He has a course on the history of the theory of evolution with The Teaching Company. Larson received the Richard Russell Teaching Award from the University of Georgia and was a charter member of the university's Teaching Academy.

Dr. Larson is a former Fellow at Seattle's Discovery Institute but according to an article in The New York Times by Jodi Wilgoren, “...left in part because of its drift to the right.” According to science writer Chris Mooney, Larson joined the institute "prior to its antievolution awakening." At the time, Larson lived in Washington state and the Seattle-based Discovery Institute dealt with Northwest regional issues. In a talk at the Pew Forum entitled , Larson said "Behe has never developed his arguments for intelligent design in peer-reviewed science articles."

Books

 Edward J. Larson (2018)To the Edges of the Earth: 1909, The Race to the Three Poles, and the Climax of the Age of Exploration; William Morrow, "an imprint of Harper Collins publishers" 

 An Empire of Ice: Scott, Shackleton and the Heroic Age of Antarctic Science, New Haven: Yale University Press, 2011.
 A Magnificent Catastrophe: The Tumultuous Election of 1800, America’s First Presidential Campaign. New York: Free Press, 2007.
 The Creation-Evolution Debate: Historical Perspectives. Athens: Univ. of Georgia Press, 2007.
 
 Evolution’s Workshop: God and Science on the Galapagos Islands. New York: Basic Books and London: Penguin, 2001.
 The History of Science and Religion in the Western Tradition: An Encyclopedia." (editor), with Gary B. Ferngren and Darrel W. Amundsen, Routledge, June 13, 2000. 
   
 Sex, Race, and Science: Eugenics in the Deep South. Baltimore: Johns Hopkins University Press, 1995.
 Trial and Error: The American Controversy Over Creation and Evolution. New York: Oxford University Press, 1985, 1989 (expanded edition), 2003 (updated edition).

Awards and honors
1998 Pulitzer Prize
2014 California Book Awards Nonfiction Finalist for The Return of George Washington'' 
2017 NCSE Friend of Darwin Award

Notes

External links

 Pepperdine University biography

Booknotes interview with Larson on Summer for the Gods: The Scopes Trial and America's Continuing Debate Over Science and Religion, June 28, 1998.
Edward Larson interview on Counterpoint Radio with Marcus W. Orr Center for the Humanities at the University of Memphis.

Pulitzer Prize for History winners
University of Georgia faculty
Harvard Law School alumni
University of Wisconsin–Madison alumni
Williams College alumni
Pepperdine University faculty
Living people
Historians of science
Members of the International Society for Science and Religion
1953 births